= Anglo-American Relations at the Paris Peace Conference of 1919 =

1961 book by Seth P. Tillman

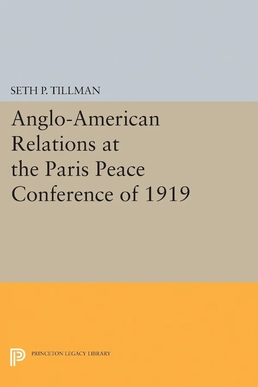
- Author: Seth P. Tillman
- Subject: History of the Paris Peace Conference
- Published: 1961 (Princeton University Press)

Anglo-American Relations at the Paris Peace Conference of 1919 is a book by the American historian Seth P. Tillman that highlights the relationships between the United Kingdom and the United States during the Paris Peace Conference of 1919—1920; the work was first published in 1961.
